It's a Mighty World is an album by American folk singer Odetta, released by RCA Victor in 1964.

Track listing
All tracks arranged by Odetta Gordon
"It's a Mighty World" (Odetta Gordon) – 2:22	 
"I've Been Told" – 2:40	 
"Reminiscing" – 2:23	 
"Hush Hush Mamie" – 2:25	 
"Camphorated Oil" – 1:35	 
"Bull Jine Run (Clear The Track)" – 2:10	 
"Come a Lady´s Dream" – 1:49	 
"Sweet Potatoes" – 2:03	 
"Chevrolet" (Lonnie Young) – 2:45	 
"Love Proved False (Waly, Waly)" – 4:25	 
"One Man's Hand" (Alex Comfort, Pete Seeger) – 3:58	 
"Got My Mind on Freedom" (Traditional) – 4:00

Personnel
Odetta – vocals, guitar
Bruce Langhorne – second guitar
Les Grinage (aka Raphael Grinage) – bass
Technical
Mickey Crofford - engineer

References

1964 albums
Odetta albums
RCA Records albums